Proya Cosmetics is a Chinese cosmetics company.

In 2006, Hou Juncheng founded Proya Cosmetics in Zhejiang Province. Proya is headquartered in Hangzhou and employs 2,720 people.

Proya was listed on the Shanghai Stock Exchange in November 2017. In the first three quarters of 2019, Proya's revenue was 2.1 billion yuan and profit was 240 million yuan, both up nearly one-third, year on year.

References

Cosmetics companies of China
Companies based in Hangzhou